Qingta Subdistrict is a subdistrict situated in the northern side of Fengtai District, Beijing, China. It shares border with Wanshou Road Subdistrict to the north, Liuliqiao Subdistrict to the east, and Lugouqiao Subdistrict to the south and west.

The subdistrict was established from portions of Lugouqiao and Liuliqiao Subdistricts in 2021.

Administrative divisions 
As of 2021, Qingta Subdistrict consisted of 14 subdivisions, more specifically 12 communities and 2 villages:

Gallery

See also 

 List of township-level divisions of Beijing

References 

Fengtai District
Subdistricts of Beijing